Samsan station is a closed railway station in Pukchil-lodongjagu, Unsan county, North P'yŏngan province, North Korea, on the former Unsan Line of the Korean State Railway. It was originally opened by the Korean State Railway in the 1970s.

References

Railway stations in North Korea